Mass Manga (born 1 January 1995) is a Gambian international footballer who plays for Banjul Hawks, as a midfielder.

Career
Born in Serekunda, he has played club football for Banjul Hawks.

He made his international debut for Gambia in 2015.

References

1995 births
Living people
Gambian footballers
The Gambia international footballers
Banjul Hawks FC players
Association football midfielders